The  is a plucked string instrument played by the Ainu people of Hokkaidō, northern Japan and Sakhalin. It generally has five strings, which are not stopped or fretted but simply played "open". The instrument is believed to have been developed in Sakhalin. By the 1970s the instrument was practically extinct, but is experiencing a revival along with the increased interest in Ainu heritage.

Construction
The instrument is typically constructed of a single piece of Jezo spruce approximately a metre long. Its shape is traditionally said to resemble a woman's body, and the corresponding words are used for its parts. A pebble is placed within the body-cavity of the instrument, granting it a "soul". The instrument tends to measure approximately 120 cm long, 10 cm wide, and 5 cm thick.

The tonkori's strings are made of gut, deer tendon, or vegetable fiber. While five-string tonkori are the most frequently mentioned, they could have as few as two or as many as six strings. The strings are not tuned in order of pitch, but are instead in a reentrant tuning alternating between higher and lower strings, rising and falling by a fifths in a pentatonic scale, often a-d'-g'-c'-f'. A similar style of reentrant tuning a was used by the ancient Japanese version of the koto, the wagon.

Performance

The tonkori is played angled across the chest, strings outward, while both hands pluck the open strings from opposite sides. The instrument was used to accompany songs or dances, or played solo. The tonkori was traditionally played by both men and women.

One description of traditional tonkori technique noted that a player would strum across all the strings, and then pluck a single string with his opposite hand. Another description notes that "the thumbs pluck in an outward direction only."

Revival

The most prominent modern tonkori performer is Oki Kano, who often uses the instrument in contemporary and cross-cultural performances and recordings.

The researcher Nobuhiko Chiba has been prominent among those researching and analysing the instrument and its music.

Etymology
The term tonkori is an  onomatopoeic description of the sound of the instrument. The tonkori was also referred to as the ka ("string"). The late-1800s explorer A. H. Savage Landor documented the tonkori, stating that it was referred to only as mukko ("musical instrument").

Linguist Emiko Ohnuki-Tierney noted that /tonkori/ was sometimes pronounced with either a voiced or voiceless stop on the initial sound: [donkori] or [tonkori]. One 1962 French publication notes the usage of the spelling donkori in an earlier work, while the 1969 Asian Review appears to use tonguri and tongari as alternate spellings.

Players
Oki Kano
K.D earth 
Sanpe (Nobuhiko Chiba)
ToyToy (Motoi Ogawa)
Kumiko Sukegawa

See also 
Ainu music
Ainu fiddle
Nares-jux, a similar instrument of Siberia

External links
Tonkori.com

Further reading
 The Ainu Tonkori: A Manual for Learning and Guide to Performance Practice, Jack Claar, Dr. Joseph Amato

References

Zithers
Ainu musical instruments